In the studies of Fourier optics, sound synthesis, stellar interferometry, optical tweezers, and diffractive optical elements (DOEs) it is often important to know the spatial frequency phase of an observed wave source. In order to reconstruct this phase the Adaptive-Additive Algorithm (or AA algorithm), which derives from a group of adaptive (input-output) algorithms, can be used. The AA algorithm is an iterative algorithm that utilizes the Fourier Transform to calculate an unknown part of a propagating wave, normally the spatial frequency phase (k space). This can be done when given the phase’s known counterparts, usually an observed amplitude (position space) and an assumed starting amplitude (k space). To find the correct phase the algorithm uses error conversion, or the error between the desired and the theoretical intensities.

The algorithm

History

The adaptive-additive algorithm was originally created to reconstruct the spatial frequency phase of light intensity in the study of stellar interferometry. Since then, the AA algorithm has been adapted to work in the fields of Fourier Optics by Soifer and Dr. Hill, soft matter and optical tweezers by Dr. Grier, and sound synthesis by Röbel.

Algorithm
 Define input amplitude and random phase
 Forward Fourier Transform
 Separate transformed amplitude and phase
 Compare transformed amplitude/intensity to desired output amplitude/intensity
 Check convergence conditions
 Mix transformed amplitude with desired output amplitude and combine with transformed phase
 Inverse Fourier Transform
 Separate new amplitude and new phase
 Combine new phase with original input amplitude
 Loop back to Forward Fourier Transform

Example

For the problem of reconstructing the spatial frequency phase (k-space) for a desired intensity in the image plane (x-space). Fourier transform the wave in k-space to x space.

 

Then compare the transformed intensity  with the desired intensity , where

 

 

Check  against the convergence requirements. If the requirements are not met then mix the transformed amplitude  with desired amplitude .

 

where a is mixing ratio and

 .

Note that a is a percentage, defined on the interval 0 ≤ a ≤ 1.

Combine mixed amplitude with the x-space phase and inverse Fourier transform.

 

Increase loop by one  and repeat.

Limits
 If  then the AA algorithm becomes the Gerchberg–Saxton algorithm.
 If  then .

See also

 Gerchberg–Saxton algorithm
 Fourier optics
 Holography
 Interferometry
 Sound Synthesis

References

 .
 .
 .

External links
 David Grier's Lab Presentation on optical tweezers and fabrication of AA algorithm.
 Adaptive Additive Synthesis for Non Stationary Sound Dr. Axel Röbel.
 Hill Labs University of Maryland College Park.]

Digital signal processing
Physical optics